Lee Vincent Howard (November 11, 1923 – April 24, 2018) was an American baseball player. Howard played as a pitcher in Major League Baseball and made five appearances, including two starts, for the Pittsburgh Pirates in 1946 and 1947. He died in April 2018 at the age of 94.

References

1923 births
2018 deaths
Baseball players from New York (state)
Major League Baseball pitchers
People from Staten Island
Pittsburgh Pirates players